(born April 24, 1972) is a Japanese softball player who played as a pitcher. She won the silver medal in the 2000 Summer Olympics.

References

Japanese softball players
Living people
Softball players at the 2000 Summer Olympics
Olympic softball players of Japan
Olympic silver medalists for Japan
1972 births
Olympic medalists in softball
Asian Games medalists in softball
Softball players at the 1998 Asian Games
Medalists at the 1998 Asian Games
Asian Games silver medalists for Japan
Medalists at the 2000 Summer Olympics
20th-century Japanese women
21st-century Japanese women